Alexia Chartereau (born 5 September 1998) is a French basketball player for CJM Bourges Basket and the French national team.

She participated at the EuroBasket Women 2017.

References

External links

1998 births
Living people
Basketball players at the 2020 Summer Olympics
French women's basketball players
Olympic basketball players of France
Power forwards (basketball)
Sportspeople from Le Mans
Medalists at the 2020 Summer Olympics
Olympic medalists in basketball
Olympic bronze medalists for France
21st-century French women